Adams Extract, owned by Adams Extract & Spice, LLC (dba: Adams Flavors, Foods & Ingredients LLC), operates a full-service spice and extract packaging and manufacturing facility in Gonzales, Texas. Best known for its Adams Best Vanilla, it also sells product under the Adams Spice, Adams Extract, and Adams Reserve brands. In addition, Adams spices, extract and seasoning blends are found in many private label brands around the country as well as being used to season many commercially produced meat and food products.

Founded in 1888, Adams is one of the oldest continuously operated companies in Texas and one of the oldest spice and extract companies in the United States.

History
John Anderson Adams, began making and selling extracts in Michigan in 1888. In 1905, he moved the family to Beeville, Texas. His wife was unhappy with the quality of the vanilla extract products available because she felt like they either baked or froze out. Mr. Adams decided to formulate one for her. When his wife tried the product, she was delighted and John replied, "Well, that's old man Adam's best." His vanilla extract became known as Adams Best Vanilla.

Mr. Adams, along with the help of his sons, Fred and Don, began to produce, package, and sell the vanilla extract door-to-door with a complete money back guarantee. After being the first to be awarded a Bachelor of Business Administration degree from University of Texas at Austin, Fred purchased the company from his father and relocated the production headquarters to Austin, Texas. In 1922, he built a two-story building downtown and continued production of the extracts and colors. Adams Extract is credited for having brought the Red Velvet Cake to kitchens across America during the time of the Great Depression by being one of the first to sell red food color and other flavor extracts with the use of point-of-sale posters and tear-off recipe cards.
His son, John G. Adams, Sr., worked in the family business throughout his childhood, and after having received his BA in Chemistry from the University of Texas at Austin, he returned and helped expand the lines produced. In 1947, he designed and built the assorted food color 4-pack line that is still sold today.

In 1955, the company built a new plant, designed by the famous architecture firm Lundgren and Maurer on I-35. This plant helped aid in the expansion of the products to include spice lines in 1959. During this time, another important person played a big role in the company's recipe development, Betty Adams.  Her name can be found on many of the original recipes boasted by the company including the "Adams 75th Anniversary Poundcake" or more commonly known as the Five Flavor Cake.

In 2000, architecture students at The University of Texas at Austin helped the Adams Extract Company design a new manufacturing campus at Buda, Texas, south of Austin.

The Adams Extract building continued production in Austin, Texas, under direction of John G. Adams, Sr., from the Adams family until 2002. In that year, the company was purchased and relocated its facility to Gonzales, Texas. It is still producing a full line of spices, and of course, the Adams Best Vanilla and food colouring line.

In 2009, the movie Extract (film) was released and based on the childhood memories creator and director Mike Judge had of the Adams Extract Plant in Austin, Texas.

In mid-July 2011, Adams Best Vanilla, six other extracts, and food colors were added as a feature product in the popular Apple iTunes app, "Cupcakes!".

In January 2013, Adams Extract & Spice, was awarded the Texas Treasure Business Award, nominated by Senator Glenn Hegar and Representative John Kuempel. Created in the 79th Texas Legislature in 2005 with passage of Senate Bill 920, the program recognizes the accomplishments of Texas businesses that have provided employment opportunities and support to the state's economy for at least 50 years and pays tribute to the state's well-established businesses and their exceptional historical contributions toward the state's economic growth and prosperity. This award was presented to the company, on January 25, 2013, in front of the Alamo in San Antonio at their 125th Birthday Celebration.

Other related information

The University Star, a student-run newspaper at Texas State University in San Marcos, Texas, was established in 1911 by Fred Adams, second owner of Adams Extract Co.

References

External links 
 Adams Extract
 Adams Extract & Spice, LLC: Private Company Information - BusinessWeek
 Boneyard Media » Blog Archive » Adams Extract Building, Austin, TX (1955-2002), Pt. 2

Food and drink companies established in 1888
Companies based in Texas
1888 establishments in Michigan